Sonadanga railway station is a railway station under Sealdah railway division of Eastern Railway system. It is situated in besides National Highway 34 at Sonadanga village on the Lalgola and Gede branch lines in Nadia district in the Indian state of West Bengal. Few EMU and Lalgola passengers trains are passing through Sonadanga railway station. It serves Nakashipara and the surrounding areas.

Electrification
The 128 km long Krishnanagar– stretch including Sonadanga railway station was electrified in 2010 for EMU services.

References

Sealdah railway division
Railway stations in Nadia district
Kolkata Suburban Railway stations